Events from the year 1998 in North Korea.

Incumbents
Premier: Hong Song-nam (acting until 5 September)
Supreme Leader: Kim Jong-il

Events
1994~1998:Arduous March 

North korea participated in the 1998 winter olympics in nagano japan.

22 June:1998 Sokcho submarine incident

26 July:1998 North Korean parliamentary election

31 August:Launch of Kwangmyŏngsŏng-1, a machine claimed to be a north korean rocket but suspected as missile tests.

5 September: The newly amended prologue for the  Socialist Constitution of the Democratic People's Republic of Korea addresses Kim Il-sung as the "Eternal president" of North Korea.

See also
Years in Japan
Years in South Korea

References

 
North Korea
1990s in North Korea
Years of the 20th century in North Korea
North Korea